Farukh Khan is a Pakistani politician who has been a member of the National Assembly of Pakistan since August 2018.

Political career

She was elected to the National Assembly of Pakistan as a candidate of Pakistan Muslim League (Q) (PML-Q) on a reserved seat for women from Punjab in 2018 Pakistani general election.

References

Living people
Punjabi people
Women members of the National Assembly of Pakistan
Pakistani MNAs 2018–2023
Year of birth missing (living people)
Pakistan Muslim League (Q) MNAs
21st-century Pakistani women politicians